Jackson Township is the name of thirty-two townships in Iowa:

 Jackson Township, Adair County
 Jackson Township, Benton County
 Jackson Township, Boone County
 Jackson Township, Bremer County
 Jackson Township, Butler County
 Jackson Township, Calhoun County
 Jackson Township, Clarke County
 Jackson Township, Crawford County
 Jackson Township, Des Moines County
 Jackson Township, Greene County
 Jackson Township, Guthrie County
 Jackson Township, Hardin County
 Jackson Township, Harrison County
 Jackson Township, Henry County
 Jackson Township, Jackson County
 Jackson Township, Jones County
 Jackson Township, Keokuk County
 Jackson Township, Lee County
 Jackson Township, Linn County
 Jackson Township, Lucas County
 Jackson Township, Madison County
 Jackson Township, Monroe County
 Jackson Township, Poweshiek County
 Jackson Township, Sac County
 Jackson Township, Shelby County
 Jackson Township, Taylor County
 Jackson Township, Van Buren County
 Jackson Township, Warren County
 Jackson Township, Washington County
 Jackson Township, Wayne County
 Jackson Township, Webster County
 Jackson Township, Winneshiek County

See also 
 Jackson Township (disambiguation)

Iowa township disambiguation pages